Ways is the third album of the Japanese rock group Show-Ya. The album was released on 3 September 1986 in Japan. All the songs were arranged by Tadashi Namba & Show-Ya.

Overview
Despite being recorded only six months after their previous album Queendom, this album manifests a strong progression both in cohesiveness of the musicians and sound. In fact, the arrangements and compositions are tighter as the result of a real group effort, while the sound of the album is very similar to what could be heard at a Show-Ya's live show at that time. On the contrary, the two poppier songs on the album "S・T・O・P (But I Can't...)" and the single "One Way Heart" were not composed by the band and are almost harbingers of next album Trade Last'''s style. The single was also used as theme for a Japanese TV show. The hard rocker "Fairy" has since become a staple of every Show-Ya's live show.

Track listing
Side one
"Shot" (Miki Nakamura, Keiko Terada) – 4:17
"Blow Away" (Miki Igarashi, Terada) – 4:28
"S・T・O・P (But I Can't...)" (Takahashi) – 4:05
"Get Up Higher" (Nakamura, Mary Stickles) – 3:34
"Over Now" (Nakamura, Terada)'' – 4:48

Side two
"One Way Heart" (Nobody, Masumi Kawamura) – 4:18
"Townscape" (Igarashi, Terada) – 4:25
"? Question" (? クエスション) (Satomi Senba & Miki Tsunoda, Terada) – 3:38
"Fairy" (Igarashi, Terada) – 3:56
"Everybody Someday" (Terada) – 5:37

Personnel

Band members
Keiko Terada – vocals
Miki Igarashi – guitars
Miki Nakamura – keyboards
Satomi Senba – bass
Miki Tsunoda – drums

Production
Akira Tanaka – producer
Takeshi Sukegawa – recording and mixing
Ron Saint Germain – remix of "One Way Heart"
Tatsuya Endou, Keisuke Hasegawa, Yasu Ito – recording engineers
Tadashi Namba – creative input and arrangements

References

External links
Show-Ya discography 
"One Way Heart" video clip

Show-Ya albums
1986 albums
EMI Records albums
Japanese-language albums